Puijila darwini is an extinct species of stem-pinniped which lived during the Miocene epoch about 21 to 24 million years ago. Approximately a metre (three feet) in length, the animal possessed only minimal physical adaptations for swimming. Unlike modern pinnipeds, it did not have flippers and its overall form was otter-like, albeit more specialized; its skull and teeth are the features that most clearly indicate that it is a seal.

It is considered to be the most primitive pinnipedimorph yet found. The genus name is an Inuktitut word for a young seal; the species name honours the English naturalist Charles Darwin. The holotype and only known specimen is a nearly complete fossilised skeleton. It is being housed at the Canadian Museum of Nature in Ottawa, Ontario.

Background
 
Puijila darwini was a semi-aquatic carnivore which represents a morphological link in early pinniped evolution.  Its fossil remains demonstrate the presence of enlarged, probably webbed feet, robust forelimbs and an unspecialized tail. This suggests that Puijila swam quadrupedally using its webbed fore and hind feet for propulsion. Phylogenetic studies including molecular evidence suggest a sister relationship between pinnipeds (seals) and ursoids (bears) as well as musteloids (weasels and otters). It had been popularly assumed that land-dwelling mammals had at some point transitioned to a more marine existence, in essence "returning to the sea" in order to gain some sort of survival advantage. However, fossil evidence of this transition had been weak or contentious.  The discovery of Puijila is important as it represents a morphological link in early pinniped evolution, and one that appears to morphologically precede the more familiarly structured genus Enaliarctos, despite apparently being a younger genus. In other words, Puijila is a transitional fossil that provides information about how the seal family returned to the seas, similar to the way that Archaeopteryx illuminates the origin of modern birds.

Discovery
This novel species was discovered in 2007 by Natalia Rybczynski and her team using surface collection and screening at an early Miocene lake deposit of the Haughton Formation of Devon Island in Nunavut, Canada. The palaeobotanical record suggests that the palaeoenvironment around the lake comprised a forest community transitional between a boreal and a conifer–hardwood forest, in a cool temperate, coastal climate with moderate winters. Puijila darwini is the first mammalian carnivore found in the Haughton lake deposits. This also gives an indication that the entire pinniped family may have originated in the Arctic.

The initial find is credited to field assistant Elizabeth Ross, and was partly a matter of luck. Ross had been unexpectedly stranded with the team's ATV which had run out of fuel several kilometers away from base camp. The brain case was discovered a year later on the first day of the 2008 field expedition by Martin Lipman, the team's photographer.

References

External links

Natalia Rybczynski at the Canadian Museum of Nature
 Brian Switek, Puijila darwini: A Significant Seal.
 Robert Boessenecker, Puijila, a very basal 'pinnipedimorph'.
 Ed Yong,  Puijila, the walking seal — a beautiful transitional fossil.
 "Fossil seal had the feet of an otter" by Bob Holmes, New Scientist, 25 April 2009, p. 10.

Prehistoric pinnipeds of North America
Prehistoric mammals of North America
Aquitanian genus extinctions
Miocene pinnipeds
Transitional fossils
Fossil taxa described in 2009
Chattian genus first appearances
Prehistoric carnivoran genera